Money Trap is a 2019 Turkish comedy film directed and written by Yılmaz Erdoğan.

Cast

References

External links 
 
 

2019 films
CJ Entertainment films
Turkish sequel films
Turkish comedy films
2019 comedy films